Sam Graham (7 April 1874–unknown) was a Scottish footballer who played in the Football League for Bury.

References

1874 births
Date of death unknown
Scottish footballers
English Football League players
Association football defenders
Bury F.C. players
Greenock Morton F.C. players